Elliot Sidney Schewel (June 20, 1924 – December 15, 2019) was an American businessman and politician who served for two decades as a member of the Virginia Senate, representing his native Lynchburg.

References

External links
 
 

1924 births
2019 deaths
Jewish American state legislators in Virginia
Democratic Party Virginia state senators
Washington and Lee University alumni
20th-century American politicians
People from Lynchburg, Virginia